"Plastic Jesus" is an American folk song written by Ed Rush and George Cromarty in 1957. They recorded it as a humorous ad spoof in 1962 as The Goldcoast Singers on World Pacific Records' Here They Are! The Goldcoast Singers (wp-1806).

The authorship of the song has historically been incorrectly attributed to Ernie Marrs, who recorded a version in 1965, despite Rush and Cromarty being listed as the authors by ASCAP and by the song's publisher, EMI Music Publishing. Ernie Marrs is sometimes credited as the songwriter because of the folk music magazine Sing Out! (Volume 14, issue number 2, page 40) crediting a version of the lyrics and music to him.

Religious basis for parody
Ed Rush has stated that the inspiration for the song came from a religious radio station from Del Rio, Texas in the mid-1950s. The station was allegedly run by a dentist and religious fanatic who "sold the most outrageous stuff imaginable, all with magical healing properties." One summer broadcast in particular contained the line "...leaning on the arms of Jesus, wrapped in the bosom of the Lord..."

Recordings, performances, and covers
 1962 - The Goldcoast Singers on the album "Here They Are! The Goldcoast Singers""
 1965 - Ernie Marrs, along with the "Marrs Family" (friends Kay Cothran and Bud Foote) recorded a version of "Plastic Jesus".
 1967 - Paul Newman, in the role of the title character in the motion picture Cool Hand Luke, sings the song while playing a banjo in a distinctly melancholy scene. The 1965 Marrs Family version is also heard elsewhere in the film.
 1971 - Tia Blake on the album Folksongs & Ballads
 1988 - Naked Prey on their album Kill the Messenger
 1992 - The Levellers on their Fifteen Years EP
 1993 - The Flaming Lips on their album Transmissions from the Satellite Heart, albeit under the title "★★★★★★★"
 1994 - Mojo Nixon and Jello Biafra on the album Prairie Home Invasion
 1999 - Sallymacs on their album Faves, Raves, and Songs from the Grave
 2000 - Rocky Votolato on his album A Brief History
 2001 - The Blackeyed Susans on their album Dedicated to the Ones We Love
 2001 - Jack Johnson on the album Live at Boulder (and on various other bootlegs)
 2005 - Billy Idol on the album Devil's Playground
 2009 - The Flametricks Subs on the album Undead at the Black Cat Lounge
 2011 - Snow Patrol on the album Fallen Empires.  This was a B-Side to a single "This Isn't Everything You Are" released in Germany, but was not included on the final album.
 2020 - Thomas Csorba on his self-titled album
 A version of the song was used as the introduction to the "Billy Sol Hargis" skits on the Imus in the Morning radio program for many years.
 A version in Dutch by Guido Belcanto in many of his live shows

Additional verses
Over the years, the folk tradition of this song has grown.

Several additional, optional verses have been added to the song.  Many folk lyrics refer to Jesus, but several other verses refer to Mary, Joseph, the Apostles, or the Devil.

Folk singer Joe Bethancourt has parodies of "Plastic Jesus" on his website, including "Plastic Vishnu," "Plastic Cthulhu," and an ecumenical version containing verses referencing several religions (Buddhism, Judaism, etc.).

References

External links
 Plastic Jesus

American folk songs
1957 songs
Novelty songs